Safo  is a village and rural commune in the Cercle of Kati in the Koulikoro Region of south-western Mali. The commune has an area of approximately 307 square kilometers and includes 14 villages. In the 2009 census the commune had a population of 16,066. The village of Safo is 20 km northeast of Bamako, the Malian capital.

References

External links
.

Communes of Koulikoro Region